Yohan de Silva (born 10 January 1994) is a Sri Lankan first-class cricketer. He made his first-class debut for Sri Lanka Ports Authority Cricket Club in the 2013–14 Premier Trophy on 13 March 2014. He made his List A debut for Sri Lanka Army Sports Club in the 2015–16 Premier Limited Overs Tournament on 28 November 2015.

References

External links
 

1994 births
Living people
Sri Lankan cricketers
Kalutara Town Club cricketers
Sri Lanka Army Sports Club cricketers
Sri Lanka Ports Authority Cricket Club cricketers
People from Anuradhapura